Mar Aprim Khamis is the Assyrian Church of the East Bishop of the Western United States. Mar Aprim Khamis was ordained as a Bishop (along with Mar Daniel Yakob) on 2 March 1973 as Bishop for Basra. He left the diocese in the same year and transferred to become Bishop of the United States and Canada. Since 1994, Mar Aprim has been serving as Bishop for the Diocese of Western United States, with his See in Phoenix, Arizona.

Diocese of Western United States

Parishes 

 Mar Patros (St. Peter) Cathedral - Glendale, Arizona
 Mart Mariam (St. Mary) Parish - Tarzana, California
 Mar Yosip (Yosip Khnanisho) Parish - Gilbert, Arizona
 Mar Benyamin Shimun Parish - Las Vegas, Nevada
 Mar Gewargis Mission - New Hall, California
 Mar Paulus (St. Paul) Parish - Anaheim, California
 Mar Rabban Hormizd Parish - Spring Valley, California
 Mar Yacoub Mission - Carrolton, Texas

References

See also
Assyrian Church of the East
Assyrian Church of the East's Holy Synod

Aprim Khamis
Living people
Year of birth missing (living people)
21st-century bishops of the Assyrian Church of the East
People from Phoenix, Arizona
20th-century American clergy
21st-century American clergy